is an anime television series produced by A-1 Pictures created as part of the media mix project of the same name. The series aired from October to December 2020.

Characters

Production and release
The anime television series was announced on December 4, 2019. Funimation has licensed the series via Aniplex. The 13-episode series was animated by A-1 Pictures and directed by Katsumi Ono, with Shin Yoshida handling series composition, and Minako Shiba designing the characters. Division All Stars performed the opening theme . Buster Bros!!! performed the first ending theme  from Episodes 1–3, while Mad Trigger Crew performed the second ending theme  from Episodes 4–6, Fling Posse performed the third ending theme  from Episodes 7–9, Matenro performed the fourth ending theme  from Episodes 10–12, and Division All Stars performed the fifth ending theme "Rhyme Anima's Mixtape" for Episode 13. The series was originally set to premiere in July 2020. However, it aired from October 3 to December 26, 2020 due to the COVID-19 pandemic.

Episode list

Notes

References

External links
 

A-1 Pictures
Anime postponed due to the COVID-19 pandemic
Anime with original screenplays
Aniplex
Crunchyroll anime
Hip hop television
Japanese idols in anime and manga
Tokyo MX original programming